Mymrino is a rural locality (a village) in Uzkinskoye Rural Settlement of Znamensky District, in Oryol Oblast, Russia. Population:

History
Mymrino got its name from the nickname that the peasants gave to their landowner; they called her Mymra. It was first mentioned in 1678 as part of the Sevsky category of the Karachevsky district as an estate in the Khotiml camp.

After the Chernobyl disaster, Mymrino was in the radiation zone of the fourth degree.

Notable people
Mymrino is the birthplace of politician Gennady Zyuganov.

References 

Rural localities in Oryol Oblast
Bolkhovsky Uyezd